Shtarbanov is a Bulgarian surname. Notable people with the surname include:
 Ilia Shtarbanov (1840 – after 1923), Bulgarian revolutionary, teacher and politician
 Nedelcho Shtarbanov (1878–1913), Bulgarian actor
 Philip Shtarbanov (1841–1904), Bulgarian revolutionary

References 

Bulgarian-language surnames